Hugh Mair was a Scottish footballer who played in the 1880s and 1890s.

Career
Mair played club football in Scotland, joining Dumbarton where he was to spend the best part of ten seasons.

Honours
Dumbarton
 Scottish League: Champions 1890-1891
 Scottish Cup: Runners Up 1890-1891
 Dumbartonshire Cup: Winners 1888–89;1889-1890;1890-1891
 League Charity Cup; Winners 1890-91
 1 representative cap for Dumbartonshire in 1890.

References

Scottish footballers
Dumbarton F.C. players
Scottish Football League players
Year of birth missing
Year of death missing
Association football forwards